The 1998 Romania rugby union tour of Argentina was a series of matches played in July and August 1998 by Romania national rugby union team.

Results

Scores and results list Romania's points tally first.

References

1998 rugby union tours
1998
1998
1998 in Argentine rugby union
1998–99 in Romanian rugby union